Nedunjeliyan II was one of the Early Pandya Kings, and "made Pandya supreme in the south".  He defeated a confederacy of the Cholas and Cheras at Talaiyalanganam near Tiruvarur and conquered most of the Tamil country establishing him as the most important ruler of his time. His deeds have been described in detail in the Maduraikkanci.

Reign 

Nedunjeliyan II was a descendant of Nedunjeliyan I. His reign has been arbitrarily fixed in the early part of the 3rd century AD. Nedunjeliyan II ascended the throne at an early age and almost immediately upon his accession, the kingdom was invaded by the Cheras and Cholas. Nedunjeliyan II, however, defeated the invaders and pursued the retreating forces as far as Thalaiyalangaanam deep inside Chola territory and inflicted a crushing defeat upon them. The Chera king Mandaranjeral Irumporai was taken captive by Nedunjeliyan.

Following his victory at Talaiyalanganam, Nedunjeliyan mounted a campaign against the Velirs and Millalai and Muttur.

Notes

References

Sources 
 

Pandyan dynasty
3rd-century Indian monarchs